Margaret Evans may refer to:

Margaret Evans (journalist) for CBC News
Margaret Evans (mayor), mayor of Hamilton, New Zealand, 1989–1998
Margaret Evans (packet ship)
Margaret Evans Price, née Margaret Evans
Marged ferch Ifan, strong woman of Snowdonia
Margaret Gray Evans (1830–1906), wife of territorial governor, Johns Evans

See also
Maggie Evans, fictional character
Peggy Evans, actress
Madge Evans, actress